Óscar Herrero is a Flamenco guitarist from Spain. He was born in Tomelloso (Ciudad Real) on 12 March 1959.

Oscar Herrero has authored several flamenco guitar teaching DVDs and didactic textbooks. Among them:

Works
Text books
 Tratado de la Guitarra Flamenca Vol. 1 - Techniques
 Tratado de la Guitarra Flamenca Vol. 2 - Advanced Techniques
 Tratado de la Guitarra Flamenca Vol. 3 - La Soleá and La Siguiriya
 Tratado de la Guitarra Flamenca Vol. 4 - Los Fandangos and Los Tangos
 Tratado de la Guitarra Flamenca Vol. 5 - Bulería
 Tratado de la Guitarra Flamenca Repertorio - Various traditional palo pieces by Diego del Gastor, Manolo de Huelva, Perico el del Lunar and Melchor de Marchena.

DVDs

 Flamenco Guitar Step by Step. Volume 1 - Techniques
 Flamenco Guitar Step by Step. Volume 2 - Techniques
 Flamenco Guitar Step by Step. Volume 3 - Techniques
 Flamenco Guitar Step by Step - La Soleá. Volume 4
 Flamenco Guitar Step by Step - La Soleá. Volume 5
 Flamenco Guitar Step by Step - La Soleá - Acompañamiento al cante . Volume 6
 Flamenco Guitar Step by Step - La Alegría. Volume 7
 Flamenco Guitar Step by Step - La Alegría. Volume 8
 Flamenco Guitar Step by Step - La Alegría - Acompañamiento al cante. Volume 9

He was awarded the first prize at the Bordón Minero (Festival de La Union, Murcia) and the Premio Nacional de Guitarra Flamenca in Jerez de la Frontera, Cádiz. He has been appointed “Special Prize for Flamenco Teaching “Festival de las Minas”.

Discography

References

External links
Oscar Herrero website

1959 births
Spanish flamenco guitarists
Spanish male guitarists
People from Ciudad Real
Living people
Flamenco guitarists